The 1924 Rochester Jeffersons season was their fifth in the league. The team failed to improve on their previous output of 0–4, losing seven games. They tied for sixteenth place in the league.

Schedule

Standings

References

Rochester Jeffersons seasons
Rochester Jeffersons
Rochester
National Football League winless seasons